Avock Island or Avokh Island is an inhabited island in Malampa Province of Vanuatu in the Pacific Ocean. The estimated terrain elevation above the sea level is some 166 meters.

Population
As of 2015, the official local population was 189 in 49 households.

References

Islands of Vanuatu
Malampa Province